Tolland State Forest is a publicly owned forest with recreational features covering  in the towns of Otis, Tolland, Blandford and Sandisfield in the southern Berkshire Hills of  Massachusetts. The state forest centers on the  Otis Reservoir, the largest body of water for recreational use in western Massachusetts. The forest is managed by the Department of Conservation and Recreation.

History
The state forest was created with the state's purchase of cut-over lumber lands in 1925. A Civilian Conservation Corps camp opened here in 1933. The Corps created the day-use and camping areas on the peninsula that extends into Otis Reservoir. In 1966, the state expanded the forest through the purchase of the reservoir and surrounding lands.

Activities and amenities
Forest trails are available for hiking, mountain biking, off-road vehicles, and cross-country skiing. The campground includes sites for tents and RVs. The day-use area offers swimming, picnicking, and a boat ramp. The reservoir is stocked in spring and fall with trout by the Massachusetts Division of Fisheries & Wildlife. The forest also offers educational programs and restricted hunting.

References

External links
Tolland State Forest Department of Conservation and Recreation 
Tolland State Forest Trail Map Department of Conservation and Recreation

State parks of Massachusetts
Massachusetts natural resources
Parks in Hampden County, Massachusetts
Parks in Berkshire County, Massachusetts
Campgrounds in Massachusetts
Civilian Conservation Corps in Massachusetts
Sandisfield, Massachusetts
Protected areas established in 1925
1925 establishments in Massachusetts